Röntgen is a relatively large lunar impact crater that lies along the northwestern limb of the Moon. Its northwestern outer rim is partly overlain by the crater Nernst. Both Nernst and Röntgen overlie the eastern rim of the much larger walled plain Lorentz. The smaller crater Aston is separated from the eastern edge of Röntgen by only a few kilometers of terrain. To the south-southeast is Voskresenskiy.

The outer rim of Röntgen has been heavily eroded by subsequent impacts, and it now forms an uneven, jumbled ring of ridges in the surface. There is a relatively fresh, cup-shaped crater along the common rim between Röntgen and Nernst. The interior floor of Röntgen is nearly level, with only a few patches of uneven terrain near the edges and a low ridge near the midpoint. The surface of the floor is marked by a few small and several tiny craterlets.

Satellite craters
By convention these features are identified on lunar maps by placing the letter on the side of the crater midpoint that is closest to Röntgen.

References

 
 
 
 
 
 
 
 
 
 
 
 

Roentgen